Convém Martelar is a 1920 Brazilian silent film directed by and starring Manuel F. Araujo.

The film premiered on 28 January 1920 in Rio de Janeiro.

Cast
Manuel F. Araujo   
Carlos Barbosa   
Adhemar Gonzaga   
António Silva   
Josefina Silva   
Albino Vidal

External links
 

1920 films
Brazilian black-and-white films
Brazilian silent short films
1920 short films